The 2015 Supercheap Auto Bathurst 1000 was a motor race for V8 Supercars held on  11 October 2015 at the Mount Panorama Circuit, Bathurst, New South Wales, Australia. It was the twenty-fifth race of the 2015 International V8 Supercars Championship.

The race was won by Triple Eight Race Engineering pairing Craig Lowndes and Steven Richards in their Holden VF Commodore. Lowndes became the fifth driver to win at least six Bathurst 1000s, while Richards himself became a four-time winner of the race with his fourth different co-driver. Lowndes and Richards finished 1.3 seconds clear of the Prodrive Racing Australia Ford FG X Falcon of championship leader Mark Winterbottom and his co-driver Steve Owen. The podium was completed by Garth Tander and Warren Luff in a Holden VF Commodore of the Holden Racing Team, a further 2.6 seconds behind.

Background
The 2015 race was the nineteenth running of the Australian 1000 race, which was first held after the organisational split between the Australian Racing Drivers Club and V8 Supercars Australia that saw two "Bathurst 1000" races contested in both 1997 and 1998. The 2015 race was the 58th race for which the lineage can be traced back to the 1960 Armstrong 500 – held at Phillip Island – and the 55th to be held at Mount Panorama.

In addition to the twenty-five regular championship entries, two wildcard entries were accepted for the 2015 race. The first was a Holden VF Commodore run by Dunlop Series team Novocastrian Motorsport for Aaren Russell and Drew Russell. The second was a Prodrive Racing Australia-prepared Ford FG X Falcon for the all-female driver combination of Renee Gracie and Swiss IndyCar Series and Formula E racer Simona de Silvestro, run under the name "Harvey Norman Supergirls".

Regular Holden Racing Team driver James Courtney did not take part in the race due to injuries sustained at the 2015 Sydney Motorsport Park Super Sprint in August. Russell Ingall replaced Courtney, having done the same at the preceding Wilson Security Sandown 500.

Chaz Mostert and Paul Morris were the defending race winners, though Morris did not compete in the race due to his role as co-driver for Mostert being taken by Cameron Waters.

Entry list 
Twenty-seven cars entered the event - 13 Holden Commodores, six Ford Falcons, four Nissan Altimas, two Mercedes-Benz E63 and two Volvo S60s. In addition to the 25 regular entries, two wildcards were entered, one from Novocastrian Motorsport with brothers Aaren and Drew Russell and one from Prodrive Racing Australia with Renee Gracie and Simona de Silvestro, marking the first time since 1998 that an all women pairing raced in the Bathurst 1000, after Kerryn Brewer and Melinda Price. Six drivers made their debut in the race; all four 'Wildcard' drivers and Dunlop Series drivers Jack Le Brocq and Macauley Jones.  It was the last start for two-time champion Marcos Ambrose.

Entries with a grey background were wildcard entries which did not compete in the full championship season.

Report

Free Practice
The first free practice session took place on the Thursday morning prior to the race and was open to both championship drivers and co-drivers. Defending race winner Chaz Mostert set the fastest lap time during the session, his time of 2:06.3223 being 1.7 seconds quicker than his time in the corresponding session in 2014. David Reynolds was second fastest ahead of Shane van Gisbergen. Garth Tander was the first driver to go off the circuit, spinning into the sand at Hell Corner, while Tim Blanchard was the first driver to hit the wall, also at Hell Corner. The second practice session was held on Thursday afternoon and was open only to co-drivers. Warren Luff set the fastest lap time ahead of Dean Canto and Steven Richards. David Russell crashed at the Cutting, causing enough damage to take the car out of the third practice session held later that afternoon. The third session saw Fabian Coulthard break his own practice lap record with a time of 2:05.4786, compared to the time of 2:05.6080 he set in the 2014 qualifying session. Mark Winterbottom, Reynolds, Mostert and Van Gisbergen all set times in the 2:05 bracket as well. Reynolds was fined 25,000 following the Thursday press conference where he referred to the entry of Renee Gracie and Simona de Silvestro as the "pussy wagon". Reynolds later apologised for his remark.

The fourth free practice session was held on Friday morning and was another session for co-drivers only. Cameron Waters was fastest with a time of 2:05.7220, while Luke Youlden was the only other driver to set a time under 2:06. In the fifth practice session, held later on Friday morning, Jamie Whincup became the first driver to set a lap time under 2:05 in a V8 Supercar, recording a time of 2:04.9097. Scott Pye also went faster than Coulthard's record, setting a time of 2:05.2436.

Summary

Qualifying
A forty-minute qualifying session was scheduled to take place on Friday afternoon, with the fastest ten drivers in the session to proceed to the Top Ten Shootout on Saturday. However, the session was stopped after five minutes following a heavy crash for Mostert. He clipped the inside wall at turn 16 on the run down to Forrest's Elbow before making heavy contact with the opposite wall. The car then bounced across the circuit and rode up along the outside wall at the right-hand bend preceding Forrest's Elbow, with the rear end of the car knocking the roof off of a marshals' post, the contact resulting in a slow 360° spin before coming to rest at the entry to Forrest's Elbow. Mostert suffered a broken left femur and left wrist, while three of the marshals stationed at the marshals' post were also injured. Mostert and one of the marshals were flown to Orange Hospital while the other two marshals were treated at the circuit's medical centre. The remainder of the qualifying session, as well as a following support race, were cancelled due to the damage caused to the marshals' post and the surrounding safety fencing. The entry of Mostert and Waters was withdrawn from the event due to the damage sustained by the car and Mostert's injuries, while the qualifying session was postponed to Saturday afternoon and shortened to thirty minutes.

Classification

Qualifying

Notes:
 – Chaz Mostert did not take part in the rescheduled qualifying session after crashing heavily in the original qualifying session.

Top Ten Shootout

Starting grid
The following table represents the final starting grid for the race on Sunday:

Race

Notes
 Chris Pither did not drive car No. 34 during the race.
 The fastest lap of the race was recorded by Car No. 1 (Red Bull Racing Australia, J.Whincup/P.Dumbrell, Holden Commodore VF) at 2:07.1226, a new lap record.

References

External links
 Highlights - Supercheap Auto Bathurst 1000, www.youtube.com

Supercheap Auto Bathurst 1000
Motorsport in Bathurst, New South Wales
October 2015 sports events in Australia